Pontypool Park is a  park in Pontypool, Torfaen, Wales. The park was formerly the grounds of Pontypool House and was laid out in the closing years of the 17th century for John Hanbury, an ironmaster, who is closely associated with Japanware. The grounds were purchased by the local authority in 1920, while the estate house was leased, and later sold, to the Sisters of the Holy Ghost to become St. Alban's RC High School. The former stables now house the Torfaen Museum. The grounds contain a number of structures including a double ice house, the Folly Tower and the Shell Grotto. The park is entered through the Pontymoile Gates. The gates, the grotto and the stables are all Grade II* listed structures, while the former hall and the ice house are listed Grade II. The park itself is designated at Grade II* on the Cadw/ICOMOS Register of Parks and Gardens of Special Historic Interest in Wales.

History 
John Hanbury (1664–1734) had developed the family ironworks at Pontypool into a successful commercial enterprise, and began the creation of the Pontypool Park estate, although nothing of his 17th century house remains. His second wife, Bridget Ayscough, was a close friend of Sarah Churchill, Duchess of Marlborough, and this connection led to Hanbury's appointment as one of the executors of John Churchill's will. The Pontymoile Gates, which now stand at the entrance to the park, were a gift from Sarah, and originally stood between Hanbury's house and the stables, before being moved to their present position in around 1835. They have a Grade II* listing.

The present house at Pontypool Park was developed by John Hanbury (1744–1784) in the late 17th or very early 18th century. Hanbury continued his grandfather's development both of the business and the estate and in around 1762, he built the folly tower as an eyecatcher. His third son, Capel Hanbury, who subsequently appended Leigh to his surname, also worked to enhance the estate. Archdeacon Coxe stayed during his Welsh tours in 1799-1800, and described a visit to the tower in the company of Hanbury-Leigh and his wife: "From this eminence, the wild and fertile parts of Monmouthshire are beautifully combined. No traveller should quit Monmouthshire without enjoying the singular and almost boundless prospect". In the 1830s, Hanbury Leigh undertook a large expansion of the house, doubling its size, the construction of new stables to the northwest of the house, and the Shell Grotto in the park. The stables, which now house the Torfaen Museum, are listed Grade II* on Cadw's historic buildings record.

After the death of John Capel Hanbury in 1921, his daughter Ruth Julia Margarette Hanbury inherited the wider Pontypool Park Estate. After marrying on 18 December 1923 and deciding to raise a family at her husband's Anglo-Irish estate in County Monaghan, Ireland, Ruth sold-off parts of the estate, selling the gardens and park to Pontypool Urban District Council and giving the house to the Roman Catholic Church. The house continues as a school, and the park is maintained by Torfaen County Borough Council.

Landscape

Location 
The park occupies a large area to the east of Pontypool town centre. The main park starts at the Pontymoile Gates near New Inn and Pontymoile Basin, and finishes to the north close to St Alban's RC High School and Torfaen Museum. To the east the land rises to the tower and the grotto. Its western border follows the Afon Lwyd river and Pontypool Leisure Centre, and Italian Gardens are located close to the western periphery. There are landscaped areas such as the Italian Gardens (refurbished in 2006) and the Nant-y-Gollen Ponds (originally one large millpond used to power a forge downstream). Three main avenues divide the park; they all merge at the leisure centre near the park's centre.

Features 
The park is set mostly to open grassland and mixed woodland with many old sweet chestnuts. One of the oldest, a 400-year-old hollow tree, was voted Welsh Tree of the Year for 2019. In 1923, the Gorsedd stone circle was created in time for the park to host the 1924 National Eisteddfod of Wales. The park is listed at Grade II* on the Cadw/ICOMOS Register of Parks and Gardens of Special Historic Interest in Wales.

Pontypool's main leisure centre is located within the park. A dry ski slope was constructed in the park in 1975 and remains in use. The park also has outside tennis and netball courts and a bowling green. Pontypool RFC also is based in the park, at its 8,800-capacity stadium. There is also a bandstand that forms part of the venue (along with nearby Torfaen Museum) for the annual Jazz in the Park festival.

The Folly Tower is a three-storey tower near the eastern edge of the park. Originally constructed by John Hanbury in 1762, it was demolished during the Second World War, after fears that it would act as a marker for German aircraft. The present tower is a replica, constructed in 1994. A short distance from this folly is the Shell Grotto. Designed by S. Gunston Tit, the structure was commissioned by Capel Hanbury Leigh and built in the 1830s. The garden historian Elisabeth Whittle describes the grotto as a "magnificent survivor". The interior is decorated with shells and bones, reputedly the work of Hanbury Leigh's first wife, Molly Mackworth.  Both sites are open to the public at weekends from May to September. Restored in the 1990s, the grotto is a Grade II* listed building.

There is also a double ice house near the old Pontypool House and Torfaen Museum. It has a Grade II listing.

Gallery

See also 
 Folly Tower, Pontypool
 Shell Grotto, Pontypool

References

Sources 

 
 
 
 

Registered historic parks and gardens in Torfaen
Parks in Torfaen
Country parks in Wales
Grade II* listed buildings in Torfaen
Grade II listed buildings in Torfaen
Rugby union stadiums in Wales
Rugby World Cup stadiums
Eisteddfod
Tourist attractions in Torfaen
Ski areas and resorts in Wales
Stadiums in Wales
Pontypool